Ernest James Webb (25 April 1874 – 24 February 1937) was a British athlete who competed mainly in the 10-mile walk. He was born in Hackney and died in Toronto. Webb competed for the Herne Hill Harriers.

He competed for Great Britain in the 1908 Summer Olympics held in London, Great Britain in the 10 mile walk where he won the Silver medal behind fellow Brit George Larner.  The two of them repeated this in the 3500 metre walk giving Ernest Webb his second silver medal of the games.

Four years later he returned to the 1912 Summer Olympics in Stockholm, Sweden where he competed in the inaugural 10 kilometre walk and finished off with his third Olympic silver behind Canada's George Goulding.

References

External links

1874 births
1937 deaths
English male racewalkers
Olympic silver medallists for Great Britain
Athletes (track and field) at the 1908 Summer Olympics
Athletes (track and field) at the 1912 Summer Olympics
Olympic athletes of Great Britain
Athletes from London
People from Hackney Central
Medalists at the 1912 Summer Olympics
Medalists at the 1908 Summer Olympics
Olympic silver medalists in athletics (track and field)